The 2020 New Brunswick Scotties Tournament of Hearts, the provincial women's curling championship for New Brunswick, was held from January 23–26 at the Riverside Golf and Curling Club in Rothesay, New Brunswick. The winning Andrea Crawford rink represented New Brunswick at the 2020 Scotties Tournament of Hearts in Moose Jaw, Saskatchewan and finished with a 4–4 record.

Andrea Crawford won her second straight and ninth overall New Brunswick Scotties Tournament of Hearts defeating Sylvie Quillian 6–3 in the final.

Qualification process

Teams
The teams are listed as follows:

Round Robin Standings
Final Round Robin Standings

Round Robin Results
All draw times are listed in Atlantic Time (UTC-04:00).

Draw 1
Thursday, January 23, 1:00 pm

Draw 2
Thursday, January 23, 7:00 pm

Draw 3
Friday, January 24, 1:00 pm

Draw 4
Friday, January 24, 7:00 pm

Draw 5
Saturday, January 25, 9:00 am

Playoffs

Semifinal
Saturday, January 25, 7:00 pm

Final
Sunday, January 26, 2:00 pm

Qualification

Prelims
January 10–12, Curl Moncton, Moncton

References

2020 in New Brunswick
Curling competitions in New Brunswick
2020 Scotties Tournament of Hearts
January 2020 sports events in Canada
Kings County, New Brunswick